The Jari River is a river in the state of Amazonas, Brazil, a tributary of the Purus River.

Course

The basin of the Jari River, an important right tributary of the Purus in its middle course, as well as the natural resources and associated fish, is protected by the Nascentes do Lago Jari National Park, an  protected area established in 2008.
It then forms the eastern border of the  Piagaçu-Purus Sustainable Development Reserve, established in 2003.
The river flows through the Purus-Madeira moist forests ecoregion in its upper reaches.
It flows through the Purus várzea ecoregion before joining the Purus.

See also
List of rivers of Amazonas

References

Sources

Rivers of Amazonas (Brazilian state)